St Oswald's Church is an active Anglican church in Collingham, West Yorkshire, England. It is in the Harrogate deanery and Diocese of Leeds. The church is on the edge of the village on Wetherby Road.

History

Dedicated to Oswald of Northumbria, an Anglo-Saxon saint the church has Saxon origins, was rebuilt in the 15th century and restored and enlarged from 1840 to 1841.  The tower was built in the 16th century and its clock was installed in 1891.

Church yard
The church graveyard contains the graves of Major General James Gunter (1833–1908), who served in the Crimean War, and Benjamin Eamonson (died 1867), who was its vicar for 29 years.

See also
Grade II* listed buildings in West Yorkshire
Listed buildings in Collingham, West Yorkshire

References

External links

Churches in Leeds
Anglican Diocese of Leeds
Listed buildings in Leeds
Grade II listed churches in West Yorkshire
Church of England church buildings in West Yorkshire
15th-century church buildings in England